Andrea Robinson may refer to:

 Andrea Robinson (singer), American singer and voice actress
 Andrea Robinson (sommelier) (b. 1964), née Andrea Immer, American Master Sommelier and chef